Betty Paoli (born Barbara Elisabeth Glück 30 December 1814 – 5 July 1894) was an Austrian writer, a companion of Princess Maria Anna Schwarzenberg (1767–1848) and friend of Maria von Ebner-Eschenbach. Paoli was a poet, journalist, translator, and art and theater critic.

Biography

Early life 
Barbara "Babette" Glück was born on December 30, 1814, in Vienna, Austria, to Theresia Glück, who had married seven months before to a high-ranking military doctor named Glück. Barbara was an unplanned pregnancy and her natural father was a prominent Hungarian nobleman. Theresia was soon widowed and left with a modest inheritance, which she soon frittered away. Mother and daughter frequently moved because of Theresia's erratic tendencies. Babette was largely self-educated, later describing her formation as  ["haphazard; mixed up"], and became an avid reader. Her first time apart from her mother was when she left her in Hungary with the family of a grammarian name Schmidt, who tutored her in foreign languages. She became proficient in English, French, and Italian. It was there she decided to earn her own living.

Babette worked as a seamstress to provide for herself and her mother until she accepted a position as governess across the border in Russian Poland. In 1830 or 1831 she left Vienna with her mother. In Poland Theresia became extremely homesick, begging Babette to leave her position, but she was unable to secure a release. Therefore, they absconded, travelling back over the border to Austrian Galicia with a band of smugglers. Theresia fell ill from the journey and died in a Galician village.

Becoming a writer 
Babette Glück remained in Galicia as a governess to a family of Polish aristocrats. As time went on she felt demeaned and missed the freedom she had before becoming a governess. Her earliest poems date from her stay in Galicia, describing how poetry restored her hope and gave her courage to go on living. During the 1830s she focused her poems on social issues; in  ["To the Men of Our Time"], the 17-year-old offers a rebuttal to critics of women's emancipation, while  ["The Poetess"] told of her predicament in being deprived of a literary ancestry. Glück stayed in Galicia until she was 20, working to fill the gaps in her education. She studied in English and became acquainted with the works of Lord Byron. Her poems continued to appear in Moritz Gottlieb Saphir's Humorist and in Prague's leading journal,  until 1846. This, however, didn't give Paoli financial security. She worked as a tutor and a translator for her livelihood while continuing to write poems. In 1841 she published a small volume entitled  ["Poems"]. The popularity of her first book admitted Paoli into the salon of Henriette Wertheimer, wife of Viennese philanthropist . As Paoli's social life grew from becoming Wertheimer's companion, financial pressure also reduced. Through Wertheimer's social connections Paoli met Hieronymus Lorm, Franz Grillparzer, Leopold Kompert, and Ernst, Baron von Feuchtersleben. Paoli also met a source of her inspiration, Nikolaus Lenau. In 1843 she published her second collection of poems entitled  ["After the Storm"]. The same year she became companion and reader to Princess Maria Anna Schwarzenberg, widow of Karl Philipp, Prince of Schwarzenberg. She remained her companion until Schwarzenberg's death in 1848.

In 1849 Paoli took a temporary post as companion to Countess  in Dahlan near Dresden. In France she met Heinrich Heine and George Sand. In 1854 Bünau's marriage to  brought Paoli's position to an end, although the two remained close friends throughout their lives. Paoli traveled to Doblbad where a Russian writer, Elisabeth Bagréef-Speranski engaged her as a companion.

As an art and theater critic 

In 1853 while also the companion of Madame Bagréef-Speranski, Paoli became a theater critic for the Hofburg, reviewing the monthly art exhibitions. She continued as a theater and art critic for the  until 1860. Throughout this era she used another pseudonym – Branitz – to translate plays from French. Experience as a critic led Paoli to meet , Heinrich Anschütz, and Fanny Elßler. Paoli also boosted careers of actors, she introduced  to Otto Ludwig and helped  and  through difficult times. She remained very close to the Gabillons, and their daughter Helene wrote crucial information on Paoli that gives us insight into the life of the writer.

In 1855, Paoli moved in with Ida von Fleischl-Marxow. The Fleischl family was very close with Paoli and adopted her into the household. Paoli would remain with them until her death on 5 July 1894.

Works 
Paoli focused on women's issues, writing essays on her own experiences with misogyny to analyze broader social issues. In 1865 she published a report on the first women's congress in Leipzig. She also commonly inverted gender-specific metaphors for her poems.

Alfred Meissner admired Paoli's work. Moritz Hartmann described her as "brilliant" and "the only woman with whom I have ever been able to enjoy uninhibited conversation". Paoli's tone was simple and direct. She used sonnets primarily as her choice of poetic form.

Publications 
Betty Paoli's published works as cited by An Encyclopedia of Continental Women Writers.

Gedichte [Poems] (1841)
Nach dem Gewitter [After the Thunderstorm] (1843)
Die Welt und mein Auge [The World and My Eye] (1844) 3 vols.
Romancero (1845)
Neve Gedichte [New Poems] (1850)
Grillparzer und seine Werke [Grillparzer and His Works] (1875)
Gedichte [Poems] (1895) posthumous selection, ed. Ebner-Eschenbach.
Gesammelte Aufsätze [Collected Essays] (1908)

References

External links 
Essays by Betty Paoli, in the original German
A selection of other works by Paoli from the Sophie database
 
Jewish Encyclopedia: “Paoli, Betty” by Isidore Singer & Frederick Haneman (1906).

1815 births
1894 deaths
19th-century Austrian women writers
19th-century translators
Austrian art critics
Austrian theatre critics
Austrian translators
Austrian women journalists
Austrian women poets
Women art critics
Women theatre critics
Journalists from Vienna
Writers from Vienna
French–German translators
Harold B. Lee Library-related rare books articles